Henry W. Brown Martín was an English footballer who played as a defender and midfielder for Spanish club FC Barcelona at the turn of the century. He was a member of some of the earliest Catalan clubs in existence such as Barcelona Football Club and Sociedad de Foot-Ball de Barcelona. Together with the Parsons brothers, he was one of the few players who was part of both the Barcelona Society of 1894–96 and FC Barcelona.

Playing career

Barcelona Football Club
Born in England, he moved to Barcelona in the early 1890s. Work reasons bring him, like many other Britons who moved to the Catalan capital. In 1892, he met James Reeves, who was recruiting football enthusiasts to create a well-organized football club, and Brown joined him, after being impressed by his passionate and entrepreneurial spirit. Together with Reeves and some other football pioneers in the city, such as George Cockram, the Morris brothers (Samuel, Enrique, and Miguel), and Alberto Serra, they formed the Barcelona Football Club in late 1892.

This entity organized the first known football match in the city, which took place on the Christmas Day of 1892 at the Hippodrome of Can Tunis. It remains unclear if he played in this match. However, he did play on 12 March 1893, in the historic match between a blue and a red team, starting as a midfielder for the latter in a 1–2 loss. Brown appears in what is regarded to be the oldest photograph of a football team in Spain, which depicts these two sides before the match at Can Tunis. He can be seen standing with a black jacket alongside Richardson and William MacAndrews. Brown played several training matches (Blues vs Reds) at Can Tunis and a few others at Bonanova between 1892 and 1895, the last of which with Sociedad de Foot-Ball de Barcelona, however, due to the little statistical rigor that the newspapers had at that time, the exact amount of matches and goals (if any) that he made is unknown. In 1895, he played as a defender in two matches against a team from Torelló, which marked the first time that teams from two different cities played against each other in Catalonia. The first game took place on 24 March 1895 at Bonanova, and ended in an 8–3 local victory. The result was attributed to the fact that Torelló's five forwards (or runners as the local press of the time called them) had trouble getting through Barcelona's strong and robust defenders: Brown and Wilson, who "every time they kicked the ball with one of those blows that raised it 30 or 40 meters away, a wave of enthusiastic applause and cheers arose".

Following the departure of James Reeves, the club's captain and leader, the Barcelona Football Society declined and disappears around 1896. The city then goes through a period of lack of interest in football, and for this reason, no Briton played football in Spain (that we know of) in 1897 and 1898. Together with the Parsons brothers (John and William), Brown played an important role in the return of football to the city, contributing in the emergence of Team Anglès, a team made up of members of the British colony living in Barcelona. However, Brown did not play in its official debut against FC Barcelona on 8 December 1899, which ended in a 1—0 win for the Britons.

FC Barcelona
Five days later, on 13 December 1899, the Blaugrana team merges with the Team Angles. Brown thus joined the ranks of Barcelona, debuting on the Christmas Eve of 1899 against Català FC (3–1), which was only Barça's second-ever game, where he apparently played as a goalkeeper in the absence of Juan de Urruela. On 26 December 1899, Barcelona and Català agreed to join the best players of each team to face Team Anglès, and with the return of Urruela and the inclusion of Català's Fermín Lomba in the defensive line, Brown was left out and instead he played for the English in a 1–2 loss. This same scenario was repeated on 6 January 1900, playing with Team Anglès for a second and last time, featuring in defense together with Jim Dykes and goalkeeper John Hamilton, two Scottish players from the predecessor of Escocès FC who were called-up to cover the losses of Team Anglès. Together they formed a strong defensive partnership, keeping a clean-sheet in a 3–0 win. On 28 January, Brown played his second and last match for Barça, a 6–0 win over Català. In February 1900, both he and William Parsons left for Manila.

References

Year of birth missing
Year of death missing
English footballers
Association football defenders
Association football midfielders
FC Barcelona players
English expatriate footballers
English expatriate sportspeople in Spain
Expatriate footballers in Spain